The South Carolina presidential primary is an open primary election which has become one of several key early-state presidential primaries in the process of the Democratic and Republican Parties choosing their respective general election nominees for President of the United States. South Carolina has cemented its place as the "First in the South" primary for both parties. 

Historically, this primary election has been much more important in the Republican Party's nomination process, considered a "firewall" that could permanently eliminate any/all serious rivals to the winner. It is meant to force the various factions of the party to decide quickly on and unite behind a single candidate and avoid wasting precious time and resources on a drawn-out battle between their own candidates, that would divert the party's focus from working to defeat the Democrats' likely nominee. Since its 1980 inception, the winner of the Republican South Carolina primary has always become the eventual Republican National Convention nominee for that fall's general election, with one exception, the 2012 primary, in which eventual Republican nominee Mitt Romney finished second, behind winner Newt Gingrich (who would go on to suspend his campaign before that summer's convention began).

South Carolina has also been important for the Democrats. In 2008, the Democratic South Carolina primary took on added significance because it was the first nominating contest in that cycle in which a large percentage (55 percent, according to an exit poll) of primary voters were African Americans. In 2020, it was also described as a "firewall" for Joe Biden, where he had considerable leverage over his opponents, particularity with African American voters.

Democratic results
1988 (caucus) (March 12): Jesse Jackson (55%), Al Gore (17%), Michael Dukakis (6%), Dick Gephardt (2%), and others (0%)
1992 (March 7): Bill Clinton (63%), Paul Tsongas (18%), Tom Harkin (7%), Jerry Brown (6%), uncommitted (3%), and others (2%)
1996: Primary cancelled
2000 (March 9): Al Gore (92%) and Bill Bradley (2%)
2004 (February 3): John Edwards (45%), John Kerry (30%), Al Sharpton (10%), Wesley Clark (7%), Howard Dean (5%), and Joe Lieberman (2%)
2008 (January 26): Barack Obama (55%), Hillary Clinton (27%), and John Edwards (18%)
2012 (January 28): Barack Obama (unopposed)
2016 (February 27): Hillary Clinton (73%) and Bernie Sanders (26%)
2020 (February 29): Joe Biden (48%), Bernie Sanders (20%), Tom Steyer (11%), Pete Buttigieg (8%), Elizabeth Warren (7%), Amy Klobuchar (3%), and Tulsi Gabbard (1%)

Republican results 

 1980 (March 8): Ronald Reagan (55%), John Connally (30%), George H. W. Bush (15%), and others (0%)
 1984: Primary cancelled
 1988 (March 5): George H. W. Bush (49%), Bob Dole (21%), Pat Robertson (19%), and Jack Kemp (11%)
 1992 (March 7): George H. W. Bush (67%), Pat Buchanan (26%), and David Duke (7%)
 1996 (March 2): Bob Dole (45%), Pat Buchanan (29%), Steve Forbes (13%), Lamar Alexander (10%), and Alan Keyes (2%)
 2000 (February 19): George W. Bush (53%), John McCain (42%), Alan Keyes (5%), and others (0%)
 2004: Primary cancelled
 2008 (January 19): John McCain (33%), Mike Huckabee (30%), Fred Thompson (16%), Mitt Romney (15%), Ron Paul (4%), Rudy Giuliani (2%), and others (0%)
 2012 (January 21): Newt Gingrich (40%), Mitt Romney (28%), Rick Santorum (17%), and Ron Paul (13%)
 2016 (February 20): Donald Trump (33%), Marco Rubio (22%), Ted Cruz (22%), Jeb Bush (8%), John Kasich (8%), and Ben Carson (7%)
2020: Primary cancelled

See also 

 2008 South Carolina Democratic primary
 2008 South Carolina Republican primary
 2012 South Carolina Republican primary
 2016 South Carolina Democratic primary
 2016 South Carolina Republican primary
 2020 South Carolina Democratic primary

References

External links 

SC GOP Presidential Primary Task Force
2008 SC Primary